The following is a list of notable Korean Americans, including original immigrants who obtained American citizenship and their American descendants.

To be included in this list, the person must have a Wikipedia article showing they are Korean American or must have references showing they are Korean American and are notable.

Art and design

 Dana Tai Soon Burgess, choreographer, cultural figure
 Richard Chai, fashion designer
 Frank Cho, comic book artist (Spider-Man, The New Avengers), writer, and creator (Liberty Meadows)
 David Choe, abstract artist
 Michael Choi, comic book artist (Witchblade, X-23 and X-Force)
 Doo-Ri Chung, fashion designer
 Peter Chung, animator, creator of cult animated TV series Æon Flux
 CYJO (Cindy Hwang), photographer, "KYOPO project"
 Dennis Hwang, artist, Google doodler, game designer and artist of Pokémon Go
 Derek Kirk Kim, cartoonist and author of critically acclaimed graphic novel Same Difference and Other Stories
 Nic Cha Kim, founder of Gallery Row in Downtown Los Angeles
 Scott Kim, puzzlemaster, artist, computer game designer
 Yu Yeon Kim, curator of art
 Grace La, designer, principal of La Dallman, professor of architecture, Harvard University Graduate School of Design
 Il Lee, artist
 Jae Lee, comic book artist (Namor the Sub-Mariner, Inhumans)
 Jim Lee, best-selling comic book artist (X-Men, Batman, Superman) and co-creator (Gen¹³, WildC.A.T.s); co-founder of Image Comics
 Lela Lee (1974– ), actress and cartoonist, creator of the comic strip and animated cartoons Kim, the Angry Little Asian Girl and Angry Little Girls
 Jiha Moon, artist
 Nam June Paik, Korean-born artist; father of video art
 Greg Pak, writer, director, actor (Robot Stories)
 Andy Park, comic book artist (Tomb Raider, X-Men)
 Peter Shin, a director of Family Guy
 Peter Sohn, animator at Pixar Animation Studios (The Good Dinosaur, Elemental)
 Amy Sol, contemporary artist based in Las Vegas, Nevada
 Tommy Yune, comic book writer and artist (Speed Racer, Robotech) and animation director (Robotech: The Shadow Chronicles)

Business

 Albert An, CEO of Tower Research Capital
 Nelson Chai, investment banker and former CFO of the New York Stock Exchange
 Do Won Chang, founder of Forever 21
 Charlotte Cho, esthetician, author and co-founder of Soko Glam
 Timothy Hwang, founder and CEO of FiscalNote and president of the National Youth Association (NYA)
 Sabrina Kay, founder and chancellor of Fremont College
 David Kim, former CEO of Baja Fresh
 Daniel J. Kim, founder of Red Mango
 James Kim, founder of Amkor, billionaire
 Jim Kim, founder of venture capital firm Formation 8
 Moon Kook-jin, founder of Kahr Arms, manufacturer of the Desert Eagle
 Brian Lee, co-founder of Legalzoom.com, ShoeDazzle.com, and The Honest Company
 Chong Moon Lee, founder of Diamond Multimedia
 Curtis Lee, founder and CEO of Luxe
 David Lee, real estate developer
 Michael Choe, CEO of Charlesbank Capital Partners
 Kewsong Lee, CEO of The Carlyle Group
 Young Lee, co-founder of Pinkberry
 Thai Lee, CEO and president of SHI International, billionaire
 Ilhan New, founder of La Choy
 Jane Park, founder of Julep, cosmetics company
 James Park, founder and CEO of Fitbit
 Sung Won Sohn, professor of economics at California State University, former president of LA Hanmi Bank
 Daewon Song, co-founder of Almost Skateboards
 James Sun, CEO and founder of GeoPage.com; The Apprentice finalist
Lisa Song Sutton, businesswoman, attorney, former Miss Nevada United States and former congressional candidate
 Michael Yang, founder and CEO of mySimon, founder & CEO of Become.com and Michael Yang Capital Partners I LP
 Gideon Yu, co-owner of the San Francisco 49ers and Executive Chairman and CEO of Bowers & Wilkins
 Richard Yoo, founder and former CEO of Rackspace

Community Leaders and Activists

 Ahn Changho, early 20th century immigrant community activist and leader, member of Korean independence movement
 Kenneth Bae, imprisoned by North Korea for human rights activity
 Emil J. Kang, non-profit arts administrator, curator, professor. Youngest president and first Asian-American to head a major symphony orchestra. First Korean-American to be nominated by the president of the United States for membership in the National Council on the Arts National Endowment for the Arts
 Angela E. Oh, attorney and social/political activist best known for her role as spokesperson for the Korean American community after the 1992 Los Angeles Riots and her position on President Bill Clinton's One America Initiative
 Park Yong-man, early 20th century immigrant community activist, member of Korean independence movement
 Song Oh-kyun, Korean independence activist (Originally from Pyongyang, North Korea)
 Song Yi-kyun, Korean independence activist and aviator (Originally from Pyongyang, North Korea)

Criminals and murderers

Seung-Hui Cho, murdered 32 people at Virginia Tech before committing suicide with a gun
Fullerton Boys, Korean gangsters

Culinary arts

 Danny Bowien, chef and owner of Mission Chinese Food in San Francisco and New York
 David Chang, chef, owner of Momofuku Noodle Bar, Momofuku Ko and Momofuku Ssäm Bar in New York City
 Roy Choi, co-founder and head chef of Kogi Korean BBQ food trucks and restaurants in Los Angeles
 Judy Joo, chef, owner of Jinjuu Restaurant (London and Hong Kong) Iron Chef on Iron Chef UK; judge on Iron Chef America and The Next Iron Chef; host of Korean Food Made Simple Cooking Channel; judge on Kitchen Inferno
 Ann Kim, chef and co-owner of Young Joni and popular pizzerias in Minneapolis, Minnesota
 Beverly Kim, finalist on Top Chef (Season 9); first winner of Top Chef Last Chance Kitchen; chef-owner of Parachute, Chicago, Illinois
 Kristen Kish, winner of Top Chef (Season 10); chef at Stir, Boston, Massachusetts
 Corey Lee, chef-owner of Michelin-starred Benu in San Francisco; former head chef at The French Laundry
 Edward Lee, contestant on Top Chef (season 9); host of television show Culinary Genius
 Maangchi (Emily Kim, 김광숙), author, popularizer of Korean cuisine and its preparation

Entertainment

 Philip Ahn, actor
 Ralph Ahn, actor
 Amy Anderson, stand up comedian and actress
 Aubrey Anderson-Emmons, actress (Modern Family)
 Fred Armisen, actor, comedian 
 Awkwafina, also known as Nora Lum, rapper, actress and comedian of Chinese and Korean descent
 Nicole Bilderback, actress
 Moon Bloodgood, actress
 Johnny Yong Bosch, actor, best known as Adam Park in Power Rangers
 Steve Byrne, comedian, actor
 Theresa Hak Kyung Cha, author, video and filmmaker
 Katie Chang, actress
 Timothy Chang, comedian and actor
 Karen Chee, comedian and comedy writer, Late Night with Seth Meyers
 Arden Cho, actress, Teen Wolf
 Henry Cho, comedian and actor
 John Cho, actor born in Seoul, South Korea and raised in Los Angeles, California he appeared in the American Pie franchise and Harold & Kumar Go to White Castle as well as the Star Trek reboot series as Hikaru Sulu; singer for the group Left of zed
 Margaret Cho, comedian, former star of the television sitcom All American Girl
 Smith Cho, actress
 SungWon Cho, actor, voice actor and YouTuber
 Kelly Choi, model, television presenter
 Kenneth Choi, actor
 Justin Chon, actor
 Alexandra Bokyun Chun, actress, filmmaker
 Daniel Chun, writer, co-producer (The Simpsons)
 Charlet Chung, actress and voice actress
 Jamie Chung, actress
 Philip W. Chung, playwright, founder and Artistic Director of Lodestone Theatre Ensemble
 Morena Corwin, model and Playboy playmate
 Piper Curda, actress and singer
 Joy Dietrich, film director
 Michaela Dietz, voice actress (Steven Universe)
 Joanna Gaines, star of Fixer Upper
 Jon Gosselin, father of sextuplets; a subject of the reality show Jon & Kate Plus 8
 Mark Fischbach (Markiplier), YouTuber and actor
 Bong Soo Han, "father of American Hapkido"; choreographed and performed in the fight scenes of Billy Jack
 Daniel Henney, model, actor in South Korea
 Gene Hong, producer, writer, and actor on Wild 'N Out
 Chanel Iman, model
 Ken Jeong, comedian, actor
 Grace Jung, comedian, writer and director
 Joseph Kahn, music video and movie director
 Angela Kang, television showrunner, producer, and writer
 Michael Kang, writer/director (The Motel, West 32nd)
 Sung Kang, actor (The Motel, Better Luck Tomorrow, The Fast and the Furious: Tokyo Drift)
 Tim Kang, actor (The Mentalist)
 Alan Kim, actor, youngest nominee for BAFTA Award for Best Actor in a Supporting Role
 Catherine Haena Kim, actress and model
 Daniel Dae Kim, actor
 Evan C. Kim, actor, best known for his role in the 1977 John Landis comedy The Kentucky Fried Movie
 Grace Kim, Playboy playmate
 Irene Kim, model and fashion designer
 Jacqueline Kim, actress
 Randall Duk Kim, actor
 Yunjin Kim, actress
 Esther Ku, comedian
 Yul Kwon, contestant on Survivor: Cook Islands
 Alexander Sebastien Lee, actor, filmmaker
 Alice Lee, actress
 Becky Lee, contestant on Survivor: Cook Islands
 Bobby Lee, comedian, actor, podcaster
 C.S. Lee, actor
 Chris Chan Lee, filmmaker
 Christopher HK Lee, film director  (Fading Away, The Last Tear, Forgotten Victory, Ayla)
 Ki Hong Lee, actor (The Maze Runner)
 James Kyson Lee, actor
 Lee Ji-ah, actress
 Justin Lee, actor
 Lela Lee, actress and cartoonist
 Liz Lee, actress, My Life as Liz
 Patricia Ja Lee, actress, best known as Cassie Chan in Power Rangers
 Raymond Lee, actor (Quantum Leap (2022 TV series))
 Rex Lee, actor (Entourage)
 Sung-Hi Lee, model who appears mostly in soft-core nude photoshoots
 Will Yun Lee, actor (Die Another Day)
 Ma Dong-seok, actor
 Charles Melton, actor (Riverdale, The Sun Is Also a Star)
 Mike Moh, actor, martial artist, stuntman (Kamen Rider: Dragon Knight)
 Leonardo Nam, actor
 Ricky Lee Neely, actor
 Soon Hee Newbold, filmmaker, actress, martial artist
 Dennis Oh, actor
 Sandra Oh, actress
 Soon-Tek Oh, actor
 Dennis Joseph O'Neil, model and actor
 Joy Osmanski, actress
 Hettienne Park, actress (Hannibal)
 Ho Sung Pak, actor, Teenage Mutant Ninja Turtles, Liu Kang and Shang Tsung in Mortal Kombat
 Grace Park, actress, Battlestar Galactica
 Joon Park, actor
 Linda Park, Korean-born actress (Enterprise)
 Randall Park, actor (Fresh Off the Boat)
 Soo Joo Park, model
 Steve Park, actor (In Living Color)
 Sydney Park, actress (Spork, Instant Mom, The Walking Dead, Spirit Riding Free, Wish Upon, Lifeline, Pretty Little Liars: The Perfectionists)
 Soon-Yi Previn, actress; wife of Woody Allen; adoptive daughter of Mia Farrow
 Lindsay Price, television actress	
 Phillip Rhee, actor (Best of the Best movies), Tae Kwon Do and Hapkido master
 Eddie Shin, actor
 Keong Sim, actor
 Sonja Sohn, actress
 Stephen Sohn, model
 James Sun, first runner-up, The Apprentice 6
 Brian Tee, actor (The Fast and the Furious: Tokyo Drift)
 Jenna Ushkowitz, actress and singer (Glee)
 Suzanne Whang, host of HGTV's House Hunters, Polly on NBC's Las Vegas, award-winning stand-up comedian
 Eugene Lee Yang, filmmaker, actor, and co-creator of the online comedy series The Try Guys
 Han Ye-seul, actress
 Steven Yeun, actor (The Walking Dead)
 Aaron Yoo, actor (Disturbia)
 Christine Yoo, scriptwriter and director of Wedding Palace
 Johnny Yune, comedian and actor (They Call Me Bruce?)
 Karl Yune, model and actor (Memoirs of a Geisha, Anacondas: The Hunt for the Blood Orchid, brother of Rick Yune)
 Rick Yune, model and actor (Die Another Day, The Fast and the Furious)

Journalism 

 Virginia Cha, CNN News anchor
 Juju Chang, ABC News anchor and reporter
 Alina Cho, CNN News correspondent
 Liz Cho, ABC News anchor and reporter
 Sophia Choi, former CNN Headline News anchor, now at KVBC-DT
 Sarah Jeong, journalist specializing in information technology law and other technology-related topics; former member of the editorial board of The New York Times
 Jay Caspian Kang, Vice News Tonight correspondent 
 Arnold Kim, founder of MacRumors
 James Kim, former senior editor at CNET
 Lee Ann Kim, anchor and reporter for KGTV; executive director of the San Diego Asian Film Festival
 Lisa Kim, NBC News news anchor for NBC11
 Michael Kim, ESPN anchor
 Seung Min Kim, White House correspondent for The Washington Post
 Mina Kimes, ESPN Journalist 
 Kyung Lah, CNN News correspondent
 Jean H. Lee, former Associated Press bureau chief in Seoul and Pyongyang
 Michelle Ye Hee Lee, The Washington Post reporter and current president of the Asian American Journalists Association
 MJ Lee, CNN News political correspondent
 Corina Knoll, Los Angeles Times reporter
 Suchin Pak, MTV News anchor and reporter
 Amara Sohn-Walker, CNN News correspondent 
 Eun Yang, NBC4/WRC-TV News anchor and reporter, Washington, DC
 Phil Yu, founder and owner of the Angry Asian Man blog
 Eunice Yoon, China Bureau Chief and Senior Correspondent for CNBC
 Young Jean Lee, New York Times writer

Law and government

 Judge Herbert Choy, appointed to the U.S Court of Appeals for the Ninth Circuit; first Asian American appointed to the federal bench
 Julie J. Chung, diplomat, Acting Assistant Secretary of State for Western Hemisphere Affairs
 Judge Donna Ryu, magistrate judge in the U.S. District Court of Northern California
 Judge Michael Hun Park, United States Court of Appeals for the Second Circuit
 Judge Kenneth K. Lee, United States Court of Appeals for the Ninth Circuit
 Wendy Lee Gramm, former head of the Commodity Futures Trading Commission and the Office of Information and Regulatory Affairs (OIRA); wife of former United States Senator Phil Gramm
Yumi Hogan, First Lady of the State of Maryland; first Korean American first lady of a U.S. state and the first Asian American first lady in the history of Maryland
 BJ Kang, FBI agent, lead investigator of insider trading case against Raj Rajaratnam
 Young Woo Kang, policy advisor of the National Council on Disability of the US White House in 2001
 Harry Kim (politician), mayor of Hawaii
 Michael Kim, trial lawyer
 Harold Hongju Koh, dean of Yale Law School and former Assistant Secretary of State during the Clinton administration
 Lucy H. Koh, judge, US District Court for the Northern District of California, appointed 2010
 Ronald Moon, Chief Justice of the Hawai'i Supreme Court
 Annabel Park, founder of Coffee Party USA
 Meroe Park, associate deputy director of the Central Intelligence Agency from 2013 to 2017
 John Yoo, Berkeley law professor and former Deputy Attorney General in the United States Department of Justice
 Sung Kim, US Ambassador to the Philippines

Elected officials

Martha Choe, city councilmember in Seattle
John Choi, county attorney of Ramsey County, Minnesota and former Saint Paul City Attorney
 Jun Choi, former mayor of Edison, New Jersey
 Dr. Steven Choi Ph.D, California State Assemblyman, 68th District
 Christopher Chung, the first elected mayor of Palisades Park, New Jersey, where Koreans constitute the majority of the population
 Hoon-Yung Hopgood, member of Michigan State House of Representatives, first Korean American elected to public office in Michigan
 Sam Park, member of Georgia's State House of Representatives, first Korean American and the first openly gay person of color elected to Georgia's General Assembly, representing the 101st District.
 Sukhee Kang, former Mayor of Irvine, California
 Mark L. Keam, member of the Virginia House of Delegates
 Andy Kim, US Congressperson from New Jersey (Democrat), former US diplomat and national security official
 Harry Kim, former Mayor of Hawaii County
 Jane Kim, Supervisor in San Francisco
 Jay Kim, former Republican Congressman from California 

 Patty Kim, State Representative of Pennsylvania
 Ron Kim, first Korean American elected in New York State
 Young O. Kim, Republican Congresswoman from California's 39th congressional district (2021–present)

 Maria Robinson, member of Massachusetts House of Representatives, representing the 6th Middlesex District (2019-present), first Korean-American to be elected to the General Court of Massachusetts
 Cindy Ryu, Washington Washington House of Representatives, first female Korean-American Mayor in the U.S.A.
 David Ryu, first Korean-American elected to the Los Angeles City Council 
 Paull Shin, Washington state senator; Korean adoptee
 Anna Song, trustee on the Santa Clara County Office of Education
 Michelle Steel, Republican Congresswoman from California's 48th congressional district (2021–present)
 Sam Yoon, Boston City Councillor (2005–2009), first Asian American to be elected to the position in the city
Marilyn Strickland, Democrat Congresswoman from Washington's 10th congressional district

Literature
See Korean American writers for a more extensive list.

 Matthew J. Baek, illustrator, children's book author, and graphic designer
 Steph Cha, novelist
 Leonard Chang, novelist, short story and TV writer
 Alexander Chee, fiction writer, poet, journalist, and reviewer
 Kah Kyung Cho, philosopher and writer
 Franny Choi, poet
 Mary H.K. Choi, author
 Sook Nyul Choi, children's storybook writer
 Susan Choi, novelist
 Jenny Han, author of children's and young adult novels, including the 'To All the Boys I've Loved Before Series'
 Euny Hong, journalist and author of The Birth of Korean Cool: How One Nation is Conquering the World through Pop Culture
 Hyun Yi Kang, scholar and writer
 Minsoo Kang, historian and writer
 Younghill Kang, early Asian American writer; has been called "the father of Korean American literature"
 Crystal Hana Kim, author
 Elaine H. Kim, writer, editor and professor in Asian American Studies
 Elizabeth Kim, journalist and novelist
 Eugenia Kim, author
 Mike Kim, author
 Myung Mi Kim, poet
 Nancy Kim, author, lawyer
 Richard E. Kim, author, professor of literature
 Suki Kim, author, investigative journalist, novelist
 Suji Kwock Kim, poet, playwright, author of Notes From The Divided Country
 Corina Knoll, editor, journalist
 Cecilia Hae-Jin Lee, writer and artist
 R. O. Kwon, author
 Don Lee, author, editor
 Ed Bok Lee, poet, writer
 Min Jin Lee, novelist
 Mary Paik Lee, author of Quiet Odyssey(1990)
 Walter K. Lew, poet and scholar
 Nami Mun, novelist
 Gary Pak, writer, editor and professor of English, noted as one of the most important Asian Hawaiian writers
 Ty Pak, writer; speaker on Korean affairs and literature
 Linda Sue Park, American-born writer
 Ronyoung Kim, novelist
 T. K. Seung, philosopher and literary critic
 Cathy Song, poet
 Jane Jeong Trenka, author of The Language of Blood
 Monica Youn, poet, National Book Award finalist
 Young Jean Lee, playwright and director
 Ji-Yeon Yuh, reporter, writer, editor and professor in Asian American history

Military 

 JoAnne S. Bass, 19th Chief Master Sergeant of the Air Force, first female senior enlisted service member of any United States military branch, first Asian American to hold the senior enlisted position in the Air Force
 Daniel Choi, U.S. Army officer and gay rights activist
 Susan Ahn Cuddy, first female gunnery officer in the United States Navy
 Major Gen. Sharon K.G. Dunbar, Commander of the Air Force District of Washington (AFDW); Commander of the 320th Air Expeditionary Wing, headquartered at Joint Base Andrews, Maryland
 Jeff Hwang, U.S. Air Force fighter pilot and 1999 winner of Mackay Trophy
 Andrew Kim, former head of CIA's Korea Mission Center
 Richard C. Kim, U.S. Army brigadier general, Deputy Commander of United States Army North
 Colonel Young-Oak Kim, highly decorated U.S. Army combat veteran of World War II and the Korean War; first non-white to command an Army combat battalion in US history
 Fred Ohr, World War II ace fighter pilot
 Peter M. Rhee, trauma surgeon and military veteran
 Sue Mi Terry, CIA intelligence analyst specializing in East Asia

Music 

 Ahn Trio, Juilliard-educated classical music trio, featured in print and television ads for Gap
 Priscilla Ahn, alternative/folk singer
 Ailee, singer based in South Korea
 AleXa, singer based in South Korea
 Amerie, R&B singer-songwriter, actress
 Anderson Paak, singer, rapper and multi-instrumentalist
 Aaron Kwak, also known as Aron, member of South Korean boy band NU'EST
 Sarah Chang, classical violinist and recipient of the Avery Fisher Prize
 Arden Cho, model, actress who also displays her singing and songwriting talents on YouTube
 David Choi, singer-songwriter and YouTube sensation
 Jae Chong, music producer, formerly of R&B group Solid
 Clara Chung, singer
 Dumbfoundead, rapper
 Dia Frampton, musician, younger sister of Meg Frampton
 Meg Frampton, musician, older sister of Dia Frampton
 Shinik Hahm, conductor, professor
 Joe Hahn, founding member of alternative rock band Linkin Park, multi-platinum and Grammy Award winner
 Heejun Han, singer and American Idol finalist (season 11)
 Laine Hardy, singer and American Idol winner (season 17)
 Hei-Kyung Hong, soprano with The Metropolitan Opera Company
 Kim Samuel, former Produce 101 Contestant & Soloist
 Danny Im, member of South Korean hip hop group 1TYM, R&B singer based in South Korea
 Yuna Ito, Korean-Japanese, America-born J-pop singer and actress
 Jessi, singer and rapper
 Brian Joo, member of South Korean duo Fly to the Sky, R&B singer based in South Korea
 Jessica Jung, singer, musical actress of the South Korean version of Legally Blonde: The Musical; former member of group Girls' Generation; sister of Krystal Jung
 Krystal Jung, singer, dancer, actress, model; member of South Korean group f(x); sister of Jessica Jung
 Nicole Jung, singer, dancer, rapper and former member of KARA
 Crystal Kay, J-pop (Zainichi Korean) singer
 Bobby Kim (Ji-Won), SMTM Season 3 winner, rapper, singer, composer with IKON, MOBB
 David Kim, concertmaster of the Philadelphia Orchestra
Dennis Kim, concertmaster of the Pacific Symphony Orchestra
Eun Sun Kim, conductor of the San Francisco Opera
 Earl Kim, pianist and composer; Harvard University professor
 Eli Kim, member of South Korean boy band U-KISS
 George Han Kim (also known as Johan Kim), singer and member of former R&B group Solid
 Paul Kim, classical pianist
 Rebecca Kim, rapper, ex-member of band After School
 Stephanie Kim, singer, dancer and member of South Korean girl group The Grace
 Soovin Kim, violinist from New York City
 Andy Lee, singer, actor, and member of South Korean boy band Shinhwa
 JinJoo Lee, guitarist and member of DNCE.
 Kodi Lee, pianist and singer-songwriter
 Megan Lee, singer, actress
 Sean Lee, violinist, four-season concertmaster and teaching assistant at Juilliard
 Sunny Lee, singer, radio host, member of South Korean group Girls' Generation
 Kevin Kwan Loucks, pianist and arts entrepreneur
 Nancy McDonie, singer and member of South Korean group Momoland
 Lucia Micarelli, violinist
 Eric Mun, rapper, actor and leader/member of South Korean boy band Shinhwa
 John Myung, bass guitar player of progressive metal band Dream Theater
 Eric Nam, singer and TV host based in South Korea
 Soon Hee Newbold, composer, conductor and violinist
 Karen O, lead singer of the Yeah Yeah Yeahs
 Eugene Park, electric violinist in South Korea
 Jae Park, singer-songwriter, composer, and guitarist for South Korean band Day6
 Jay Park, hip hop singer, rapper, b-boy, dancer, and former ex leader of 2PM
 John Park, singer and first runner up of Superstar K2, Korean version of American Idol, semi-finalist on American Idol. 
 Park Joon-hyung, rapper and leader/member of South Korean pop group g.o.d
 Lena Park, K-pop, R&B singer, songwriter, composer
 Mike Park, ska and punk musician, founder of Asian Man Records
 Teddy Park, member of 1TYM, singer/rapper/producer based in South Korea.
 Todd Park Mohr, lead vocals/guitars/keyboards/saxophone of Big Head Todd and the Monsters

 Peniel Shin, rapper, and member of South Korean boy group BTOB
 Son Hoyoung, singer and member of South Korean pop group g.o.d
 Susie Suh, singer-songwriter, signed with Epic Records
 T, R&B singer based in South Korea
 Nosaj Thing (Jason Chung), electronic musician
 Tiger JK, musician
 Tim, R&B singer based in South Korea
 Kevin Woo, singer, dancer and member of South Korean Boy Band U-KISS
 Steve Seung-Jun Yoo, singer and dancer formerly based in South Korea
Scott Yoo, conductor, host of Now hear this on the PBS network.
 Tiffany Young, singer, musical actress Fame as Carmen Diaz; member of South Korean group Girls' Generation
 Michelle Zauner, singer and songwriter who performs under the name Japanese Breakfast
 Tokimonsta (Jennifer Lee), electronic music artist, producer, and DJ

Religion

 Su Bong, Soen Sa Nim in the Kwan Um School of Zen and the designated heir of Seung Sahn's lineage
 Peter Ahn, translator of the New American Standard Bible
 Eugene Cho, President of Bread for the World
 Hae Jong Kim, Bishop of the United Methodist Church
 Julius Kim, President of The Gospel Coalition
 Walter Kim, President of National Association of Evangelicals
 James A. Lee, President of Southern Reformed College and Seminary
 Michael Oh, CEO of Lausanne Committee on World Evangelization
 Andrew S. Park, theologian
 Angela Warnick Buchdahl, rabbi

Science, technology and education

 Tae-Ung Baik, professor of law at the University of Hawaii Manoa William S. Richardson School of Law; legal scholar of international human rights law and Korean law
 Victor Cha, professor in Asian studies, former Director for Asian Affairs in the White House's National Security Council
 Dennis Choi, neuroscientist at Emory University, member of the Institute of Medicine of the National Academies, former executive vice president for neuroscience at Merck, former chairman of the department of neurology at Washington University in St. Louis School of Medicine
 Howard Choi, spinal cord injury specialist
 Esther Choo, emergency physician and professor at the Oregon Health & Science University
 John Chun, designer of AC Cobra and Shelby Mustang GT350 and GT500 models; Tonka Toys designer
 Jefferson Han, one of the main developers of "multi-touch sensing" technology, owner of Perceptive Pixel company
 Moo-Young Han, physicist
 Dennis Hong, professor and the founding director of RoMeLa (Robotics & Mechanisms Laboratory) of the Mechanical & Aerospace Engineering Department at UCLA
 Waun Ki Hong, Division Head and Professor at the University of Texas MD Anderson Cancer Center and pioneer in field of cancer chemoprevention and cancer medicine.
 Hyun Yi Kang, scholar and writer; chair of Women's Studies and Associate Professor in Comparative Literature and English at University of California, Irvine
 Minsoo Kang, historian and writer at University of Missouri
 Sung-Mo "Steve" Kang, chancellor of University of California, Merced; former professor of electrical and computer engineering at various institutions
 Larry Kwak, world-renowned physician and scientist who has pioneered breakthrough innovations in immunology and cancer vaccines; and named one of Time Magazine's 100 Most Influential People in 2010.
 Jaegwon Kim, William Herbert Perry Faunce Professor of Philosophy at Brown University
 Jeong H. Kim, president of Bell Labs
 Jim Yong Kim, Francois Xavier Bagnoud Professor Health and Human Rights at Harvard University; former director of HIV/AIDS at the World Health Organization; 17th president of Dartmouth College; president of the World Bank
 June Huh, 2022 Fields medalist mathematician, professor at Princeton University 
 Peter S. Kim, president of Merck, former MIT-Whitehead Institute for Biomedical Research biochemist, member of National Academy of Sciences
 Howard Koh, professor of the Practice of Public Health; associate dean for Public Health Practice at the Harvard School of Public Health; former Massachusetts Commissioner of Public Health
 Bandy X. Lee, psychiatrist with Yale University and the co-author of the book, The Dangerous Case of Donald Trump
 Benjamin W. Lee, theoretical physicist (influenced development of the Standard Model)
 Chang-Rae Lee, professor of creative writing at Princeton University; novelist
 David Oh, NASA engineer and lead flight director of the Mars Curiosity rover
 Andrew S. Park, Methodist theologian
 Gary Pak, professor of English at University of Hawaii at Mānoa; one of the most important Asian Hawaiian writers
 No-Hee Park, Dean of the School of Dentistry at the University of California, Los Angeles.
 Mark L. Polansky, NASA astronaut
 Michelle Rhee, former chancellor of District of Columbia Public Schools; education reform advocate
 Sebastian Seung, computational neuroscientist, brain and cognitive sciences professor at MIT, and author of Connectomes
 Nam-Pyo Suh, doctor of engineering of Carnegie Mellon University, 14th president of KAIST in South Korea
 Jeannie Suk, assistant professor of law at Harvard Law School; award-winning writer
 Meredith Jung-En Woo, dean of the college and graduate school of arts and sciences at the University of Virginia, professor of political science and Korean studies
 Ji-Yeon Yuh, professor in Asian American history and Asian diasporas at the Northwestern University
 Joon Yun, radiologist; founder of Palo Alto Institute

Sports
 
 Kenny Allen Former NFL player; Father is from Korea
 Darwin Barney, MLB player; grandfather is from Korea and grandmother is from Japan
 Marissa Brandt, Olympic ice hockey player
 Eugene Chung, former NFL player, first Korean American to be drafted in the 1st round, played offensive line
 Rich Cho, NBA executive, Vice President of Basketball Strategy of Memphis Grizzlies
 Simon Cho, Olympic speed skater; won the bronze medal in men's 5000 meter relay at the 2010 Vancouver Games
 Hank Conger, MLB player

 Emily Cross, Olympic fencer; won the silver medal in foil team at the 2008 Beijing Games
 Toby Dawson, Olympic skier, won the bronze medal in men's freestyle skiing at the 2006 Torino Games
 Bill Demong, Olympic skier; mother is half Korean
 Marcus Demps, American football player
 Will Demps, American football player
 Dane Dunning, MLB Player
 Jake Dunning, MLB player
 Tommy Edman, MLB player, mother is from Korea. 
 Tom Farden, head coach of the Utah Red Rocks
 Marcus Freeman, head coach of Notre Dame Football, former NFL player
 James Hahn, professional golfer
 Kyle Hamilton, First-team All-American Notre Dame football player
 Benson Henderson, mixed martial artist, former UFC lightweight champion
 John Huh, professional golfer
 Vicky Hurst, professional golfer
 Anthony Kim, professional golfer
 Chloe Kim, elite snowboarder, Winter X Games gold medalist (superpipe, 2015) Olympic gold medalist (halfpipe, 2018)
 Christina Kim, professional golfer
 Kevin Kim, tennis player
 Jessica Pegula, tennis player; daughter of Terry and Kim Pegula
 Kim Pegula, businesswoman and co-owner of Pegula Sports and Entertainment (Buffalo Bills, Buffalo Sabres, and other teams) alongside her husband Terry; born in Seoul and adopted by an American family at age 5
 Younghoe Koo, American football player
 Tae Man Kwon, Hapkido Grand Master; 9th degree Black Belt
Brandun Lee, professional boxer
 Jeanette Lee, pool player, nicknamed "The Black Widow" for her tendency to wear black
 John Lee, former football player
 Sammy Lee, diver, first American-born male Asian Olympic gold medalist
 David Lipsky, professional golfer; mother is from Korea
 Moon Tae-jong, professional basketball player
 Kyler Murray, NFL quarterback
 Kevin Na, professional golfer
 Naomi Nari Nam, figure skater
 Jim Paek, NHL hockey player
 Angela Park, professional golfer
 Jane Park, professional golfer
 Richard Park, NHL player
 BJ Penn, mixed martial artist and former UFC lightweight and welterweight champion
 Rob Refsnyder, MLB player;  born in Seoul, South Korea, and adopted by a couple from Southern California when he was five months old.
 Jhoon Rhee, taekwondo master and entrepreneur
 Terrmel Sledge, MLB player
 Daewon Song, professional skateboarder
 Sonya Thomas, aka "Black Widow," competitive eater, holder of 29 world titles
 Hines Ward, football player, MVP of Super Bowl XL
 Michelle Wie West, professional golfer
 Alex Yi, soccer player
 Ariane Andrew also known as Cameron, professional wrestler
 Mia Yim also known as Jade, professional wrestler
 James Yun, professional wrestler
Ben Leber, NFL Linebacker

Other

 Emma Broyles, Miss America 2022, as Miss Alaska.
 Philip Jaisohn, first Korean to become an American citizen; first Korean American to receive an American medical degree (Originally from Boseong County, Jeollanam-do, South Korea)

References

External links 
 Council of Korean Americans – a national, nonpartisan, nonprofit organization of Korean American leaders
 KAPS – Korean American Professionals Society
 KorAmeLit.htm – selection of Korean-American literature
 KoreAm Journal – news, stories, and issues of Korean Americans nationwide
 Korean American Literature – comprehensive bibliography of Korean American authors and their books
 Arirang  – interactive history of Korean Americans

Americans
Korean Americans
Korean
Korean